Lebanese Turkmen (Atrāk Lubnān), also known as the Lebanese Turks, are people of Turkish ancestry that live in Lebanon. The historic rule of several Turkic dynasties in the region saw continuous Turkish migration waves to Lebanon during the Tulunid rule (868–905),  Ikhshidid rule (935–969), Seljuk rule (1037–1194), Mamluk rule (1291–1515), and Ottoman rule (1516–1918).

Today, many of the Turkish Lebanese community are the descendants of the Ottoman Turkish settlers to Lebanon from Anatolia. However, with the declining territories of the Ottoman Empire in the 19th century, ethnic Turkish minorities from other parts of the former Ottoman territories found refuge in Ottoman Lebanon, especially Algerian Turks after the French colonization of North Africa in 1830, and Cretan Turks in 1897 due to unrest in Greece. 

Ottoman rule in Cyprus came to an end in 1914, when control of the island passed over the British Empire. In the 1920s, the harsh economic conditions of the Great Depression led some Turkish Cypriot families to "sell" their daughters as brides- mainly in Palestine, but also in other Arab-majority regions, including neighbouring Lebanon. Due to the 1947–1949 Palestine war, many of these Turkish Cypriot women were forced to leave Palestine and seek refuge with their families in Lebanon. More recently, since 2011, there has been a substantial wave of Syrian Turks who have fled the Syrian civil war and have taken refuge in Lebanon. They now outnumber the long-established Turkish community which descend from the Ottoman times.    
  
In addition to the descendants of centuries-old Turkish communities, as well as more recent refugees, since the 20th century, Lebanon has attracted Turkish economic workers who have come from the Republic of Turkey.

History

Tulunid rule (868–905)

Ikhshidid rule (935–969)

Seljuk rule (1037–1194)

Mamluk rule (1291–1515)

Assaf dynasty
The Assafs were the descendants of Turkmen tribesmen settled in the Keserwan area of central Mount Lebanon, north of Beirut under the early Mamluk rulers. According to the local chronicler Tannus al-Shidyaq (d. 1861), the Turkmens were settled there by the Mamluk governor of Damascus, Aqqush al-Afram, following his punitive expedition against the rebellious Alawites, Twelver Shia Muslims, Druze and Maronites of Keserwan and the neighboring Jurd area to the south in 1305. The rebels were decisively suppressed by January 1306, their lands were transferred as iqtas to Mamluk emirs in Damascus and later that year the Turkmens were settled there. They were established in the villages of Ayn Shiqaq, Ayn Tura, Zuq Masba, Zuq Mikhayil, Zuq al-Amiriyya and Zuq al-Kharab, having been previously settled in the Kura region near Tripoli. The Assaf or the Turkmens, in general, were entrusted by the Mamluks with maintaining a 300-strong cavalry unit to patrol the region between Beirut and Byblos and to guard entry into the Keserwan from Beirut. At least part of them were resettled in Beirut by the strongman of the Mamluk Sultanate, Yalbugha al-Umari, to reinforce the Damascene troops stationed there to defend the town against a potential Crusader attack in the aftermath of the Cypriot raid on Alexandria. 

In 1382, the Mamluk emir Barquq usurped the throne in Cairo, establishing the Burji regime. The latter were ethnic Circassians unlike their Turkmen Bahri predecessors, which resulted in frayed relations between the Turkmens of Keserwan and the new rulers. Nonetheless, Barquq kept the Turkmen emirs as the lords of Keserwan, albeit in a weakened state. Barquq likely kept the Turkmens in place to avoid giving the Buhturids too much power in Mount Lebanon or to avoid over-extending Buhturid forces. According to the historian Kamal Salibi, only four Turkmen emirs have been named in primary sources: a certain Sa'id who ruled in 1361, his brother and successor Isa, and a certain Ali ibn al-A'ma and his brother Umar ibn al-A'ma. The latter two were the Turkmen emirs involved in the rebellion against Barquq. Ali was killed in Barquq's punitive expedition, while Umar was imprisoned and released.

Ottoman rule (1516–1918)

Turkish migration from Ottoman Anatolia
Lebanon became part of the Ottoman Empire in 1516, and Turks were brought into the region along with Sultan Selim I’s army during his campaign to Egypt and were settled in the conquered lands. Turkish colonists were encouraged to stay in Lebanon by being rewarded with land and money.

Turkish migration from Ottoman Algeria
In 1830 many Algerian Turks were forced to leave Ottoman Algeria once the region came under French colonial rule. Whilst the majority went to Ottoman Anatolia, some Turkish and Kouloughli families also went to Ottoman Syria which included Lebanon at the time.

Turkish migration from Ottoman Crete
The history of the Cretan Turks in Lebanon began when the Ottoman Empire lost its dominion over the island of Crete. After 1897, when the Ottoman Empire lost control of the island, they sent ships to protect the island’s Cretan Turks. Most of these Turks were settled in Izmir and Mersin, but some of them were also sent to Tripoli and Damascus. After World War I, the Ottoman Empire lost Lebanon, however, some of the Cretan Turks remained in Tripoli where their relatives lived. Today, there are about 10,000 Cretan Turks remaining in Tripoli.

Modern migration

Turkish Cypriot brides (1910s–1950s)
 
Ottoman rule in Cyprus came to an end in 1914, when control of the island passed over the British Empire. In the 1920s, the harsh economic conditions of the Great Depression led many Turkish Cypriot families in the poorest villages, facing debt and starvation, to marry off their daughters to Arab men- mainly in Palestine, but also to other Arab-majority regions such as neighbouring Lebanon. Such payments had not been part of Cypriot tradition, and Turkish Cypriots typically describe the girls in these forced marriages as having been "sold"; Arabs however, often object to this characterization. Mostly between the ages of 11 and 18, the majority of the girls lost contact with their families in Cyprus, and while some had successful marriages and families, others found themselves little more than domestic servants, abused, or ended up working in brothels. The marriages were sometimes arranged by brokers, who presented the prospective husbands as wealthy doctors and engineers. However, Neriman Cahit, in her book "Brides for Sale", found that in reality many of these men had mediocre jobs or were already married with children. Unaware of these realities, Turkish Cypriot families continued to send their daughters to the Arab world until the 1950s.

Turkish Cypriot refugees from Palestine to Lebanon (1947–1949)
Approximately 4,000 Turkish Cypriot brides were sent to Palestine. Whilst the total number originally sent to Lebanon is unknown, Turkish Cypriot women who formed their new families in Palestine soon found themselves as Palestinians refugees in Lebanon (as well as in Jordan) after fleeing the 1947–1949 Palestine war.

Palestinian Turkmen refugees to Lebanon (1947–1949)

Mainland Turkish workers (1950s–present)
In the 1950s, thousands of Turks left the city of Mardin and headed for Lebanon because of the economic crisis and high unemployment rate in Turkey. Many of these migrants settled in Beirut and could already speak Arabic. Therefore, they quickly adapted to life in Lebanon.

Syrian Turkmen refugees (2011–present)

In October 2015 the Syrian independent newspaper Zaman Al Wasl reported that 125,000 to 150,000 Syrian Turkmen refugees, who have escaped from the Syrian civil war, have settled in Lebanon, and hence they now outnumber the Turkish minority of Lebanon.

Demographics

Population

Turkish minority (Ottoman descendants) 
In 2011 Al Akhbar reported that the number of Turks in Lebanon who descend from settlers who arrived in the region during the late Ottoman period was 80,000. This, however, does not include the descendants of the much earlier Turkish migrants to Lebanon.

Syrian Turkmen refugees
The Turkish-Lebanese population has increased significantly with the arrival of Syrian Turkmen refugees during the Syrian civil war. In 2015, there were approximately 120,000–150,000 Syrian Turkmen refugees in the country. Approximately 90,000 Syrian Turkmen were living in Arsal. By 2018, the number of Syrian Turkmen refugees throughout Lebanon had increased to approximately 200,000.

Areas of settlement

The descendants of the early Ottoman Turkish settlers mainly live in Akkar (including the villages of Kouachra and Aydamun) and Baalbeck, while the descendants of the later Ottoman Turkish arrivals, mainly the Cretan Turks, currently live in Tripoli. More recent Turkish arrivals to modern Lebanon from Turkey and Syria (Syrian Turks) live in Beirut and Arsal. There are also Turkmen living in villages around Dinniye in the North Governorate.

Politics

The Turkish community is becoming more politically active by seeking better representation locally and support from the Turkish embassy in Beirut.

Organisations
Established in 1997, the "Future Youth Association", located in Beirut's Witwat neighborhood, is the most active Turkish association in Lebanon. Because of confusion over its name with the Future Movement, its office sustained damage during the 7 May 2008 armed clashes in Beirut between pro-Hariri and pro-Hezbollah forces. The Future Youth Association organises Turkish language classes in Beirut using teachers sent from Turkey’s Ministry of Education. The turnout for these classes have so far exceeded expectations, with many Lebanese of Turkish origin attending classes.

Associations
The Lebanese Turkish Cultural Association, established in 2010 in Eidmon and chaired by Kamal Maqsoud
The Lebanese Turkmen Association, established in 2012 and chaired by Ahmed Al-Turkmani
The Lebanese Turkish Brotherhood Association, established in 2012 in the town of Kouachra
Inmaa Hawara Turkmen Society, established in 2015 in Mejdlaya, headed by Muhammad Turkmani
Duras Social Charitable Society, established in 2006 in Baalbek and represented by Ali Ibrahim Ghurli

Notable people 

 Etel Adnan, poet and visual artist  
 Fawzi al-Qawuqji, military figure 
 Nour Al Hoda, actress
 Nour al Nimer, designer  
 Mostapha al-Turk, mixed martial artist
 Dina Al-Sabah, bodybuilder
 Nabil A. Bayakly,  Assistant Professor of Biology at LeMoyne-Owen College and Adjunct Professor for Islamic Studies at Memphis Theological Seminary
 Safia Chamia, Tunisian singer and actress 
 Omar El-Turk, basketball player 
 Samah Ghandour, broadcaster and actress 
Yasmine Ghata, French writer
 Esma Chamly-Halwani, Professor
Eileen Hofer, Swiss filmmaker 
Hussen Ibraheem, director
Skandar Keynes, British actor
Soumaya Keynes, British journalist and economist 
 Khashoggi family (originally from Kayseri) 
Emad Khashoggi, businessman and part of the Saudi-Turkish Khashoggi family
Nabila Khashoggi, businesswoman and part of the Saudi-Turkish Khashoggi family
Vénus Khoury-Ghata, poet, writer and winner of the Miss Beirut beauty pageant
Amin Maalouf, writer
Ibrahim Maalouf, jazz trumpeter and composer
Nassim Maalouf, trumpeter
 Maraachli family (originally from Maraş)
 Haya Maraachli, actress 
 Ibrahim Maraachli, actor and comedian 
 Lama Maraachli, actress 
 Randa Maraachli, actress 
 Tarek Maraachli, actor
 Huda Naamani, Feminist writer and artist
 Ahmad Nami, second President of Syria (1926–28) 
 Jamal Sleem Nuweihed, writer
 Bilal Aziz Özer, football player
 Mouazzez Rawdah, artist
 Ahmad Shukeiri, first Chairman of the Palestine Liberation Organization
 Nadia Sirry, painter
 Rola Yammout, singer
 Fathi Yakan, Islamic cleric 
Rose al Yusuf, actress and journalist
Nada Zeidan, rally driver 
Nazih Zuhdi, world-renowned heart surgeon
Maher zain, Muslim Swedish R&B singer of Lebanese and Turkish origin

See also 
Assaf dynasty
Turkish minorities in the former Ottoman Empire
Turkish Cypriots 
Turks in the Arab world
Turks in Egypt
Turks in Syria 
Turks in Israel 
Turkish diaspora
Turks in France 
Turkish Americans
Turkish Australians 
 History of Lebanon under Ottoman rule
 Lebanon–Turkey relations

References

Bibliography 

 .
 .
 .

  

Turkish diaspora by country
Ethnic groups in Lebanon
Middle Eastern diaspora in Lebanon